Katarzyna Skarpetowska is a dancer and choreographer of Polish descent. She danced with the Lar Lubovitch Dance Company  from 2007 - 2014, and Parsons Dance Company. from 1999-2006. Her choreography, often set on the Parsons company, is noted for providing a more emotionally complicated contrast to Parson's work.

She performed in the Broadway musical METRO at age 15 directed by Janusz Jozefowicz. Following the show's run, she attended NYC High School for the Performing Arts and then received a BFA in Dance from  The Juilliard School in 1999 under artistic director Benjamin Harkarvy. After graduation, she joined Parsons Dance, performing leading roles  in the company’s repertory including the iconic CAUGHT. With the Lar Lubovitch Dance Company, Katarzyna performed at many reputable venues such as New York’s City Center, The Kennedy Center and The Bolshoi Theater, and was a guest artist with The Battleworks Dance Company and Buglisi Dance Theater. Her choreography has been performed by Richmond Ballet, Alvin Ailey American Dance Theater II, Lar Lubovitch Dance Company, Parsons Dance, Buglisi Dance Theater, Houston Metropolitan Dance Company, Hubbard Street 2, among others.

She was named one of Dance Magazine's "25 to Watch" in 2016.

References
Urban Gardner: A Choreographer's Palette, The Process Behind Creating a Dance

External links
 Official site

Living people
American choreographers
Modern dancers
American people of Polish descent
Year of birth missing (living people)